Zoe Jones may refer to:

 Zoe Jones (figure skater) (born 1980), British figure skater
 Zoe Jones (darts player) (born 1992), English darts player

See also
 Zoe Lister-Jones (born 1982), American actress, singer, playwright, and screenwriter